Celyn may refer to:

Capel Celyn Halt railway station, on the Great Western Railway's Bala Ffestiniog Line in Wales
Garth Celyn, a historical monument that includes the manor house Pen y Bryn in Abergwyngregyn, Wales
Llyn Celyn, a reservoir in the valley of the River Tryweryn in North Wales
Capel Celyn, a rural community that was flooded to create the reservoir 
Celyn, the Welsh word for holly

See also
 Celine (disambiguation)